The Flamingo was a passenger night train operated by the Louisville and Nashville Railroad.

History
Inaugurated on September 27, 1925, it operated between Cincinnati and Atlanta, Georgia, with sleeper service between Cincinnati Union Terminal and Atlanta Union Station.It was operated in conjunction with the Central of Georgia Railway and the Atlantic Coast Line Railroad. From Albany to Jacksonville the Flamingo ran in tandem with the Illinois Central's Seminole, departing stations with an identical schedule for that final segment. In Jacksonville riders could continue their trips to elsewhere in Florida on various ACL branch lines that served different parts of the state, such as St. Petersburg, Sarasota (via Orlando and Tampa), Ft. Myers and Miami. Travellers to Miami would transfer in Jacksonville to the FEC's Havana Special. The Southland operated on similar route from Cincinnati to Albany portion, however, the Southland ran overnight through Georgia.

An empty oil tanker that had been attached to a north-bound freight train came loose and hit and wrecked the Flamingo near Falmouth, Kentucky in 1957. The injured received care at a local hospital.

Service was truncated to Atlanta in 1962; by September 8, 1965 the name was removed from the train. It was discontinued on March 7, 1968.

The dining car, originally built in 1948, was restored and returned to service by the Kentucky-Indiana Rail Advocates in 1998, serving up food on the dinner train from original recipes like seafood gumbo, lamb, plum pudding, and ham with red eye gravy.

Major stations served
Cincinnati Union Station
Covington, Kentucky
Winchester, Kentucky 
Corbin, Kentucky (with connections to and from Louisville to the west)
Knoxville L&N Station
Cartersville, Georgia
Marietta Depot
Atlanta Union Station
Albany Union Station
Jacksonville Union Station

References

Further reading

External sites
December 1965 L&N schedule

Louisville and Nashville Railroad
Passenger rail transportation in Ohio
Passenger rail transportation in Kentucky
Passenger rail transportation in Tennessee
Passenger rail transportation in Georgia (U.S. state)
Passenger rail transportation in Florida
Named passenger trains of the United States
Night trains of the United States
Passenger trains of the Atlantic Coast Line Railroad
Passenger trains of the Central of Georgia Railway
Passenger trains of the Louisville and Nashville Railroad
Railway services introduced in 1925
Railway services discontinued in 1968